The following is a list of Public Service Commissioners of North Dakota. The three public service commissioner offices were created in 1940 and terms began on January 1, 1941, replacing the three offices that made up the North Dakota Railroad Commission.

Commissioner 1

Commissioner 2

Commissioner 3

See also
North Dakota Public Service Commission

References

Public Service Commissioners